The Miss Brazil 2003 pageant took place on April 26, 2003. Each state and the Federal District competed to win the title of the Brazilian crown. The winner entered Miss Universe 2003. Miss Brazil Mundo would enter Miss World 2003. Miss Internacional Brazil entered Miss International 2003.

Results

Special awards
Miss Internet - Gislaine Rodrigues
Miss Congeniality - Jacqueline Oliveira
Miss Photogenic - Michelly Freitas
Best National Costume - Franscieli Dulianel

Delegates

 - Gislene Charaba
 - Danielle Nascimento
 - Adriana Xavier
 - Aline Hayashi
 - Acássia Rodrigues
 - Jacqueline Oliveira
 - Cynthia Campelo
 - Franscieli Dulianel
 - Lara Andressa de Brito
 - Katia Correa
 - Allynne Langer
 - Michelly Freitas
 - Rafaella Tinti
 - Carlessa Rubicínthia Macedo da Rocha
 - Mayana Neiva
 - Elaine Lopes †
 - Meyrielle Abrantes
 - Elaine Fernandes
 - Fernanda Louback
 - Maria Cecília Valarini
 - Tatyana Scarelli
 - Cláudia Boschilia
 - Karla Grizotti
 - Verginia Rosso
 - Juliana Volpini
 - Fabrizia Santana
 - Gislaine Rodrigues Ferreira

External links
  Official site

2003
2003 in Brazil
2003 beauty pageants